"Mood Swings" is a song by American rapper A Boogie wit da Hoodie, released on September 13, 2019 by Highbridge and Atlantic Records. It is the lead single from his third studio album Artist 2.0 (2020), and was produced by Wheezy.

Composition
The song focuses on A Boogie's "journey as an artist and the rollercoaster of emotions that comes with fame." Boogie sings and raps about his mood swings while dealing with fame and his sexual conquest. The chorus is built around him not using the last syllable of a word, replaced with a humming sound instead. The instrumental was produced by Wheezy, and features an "over-the-top base-filled trap beat with smooth guitar play".

Music video
The music video was released on September 17, 2019, and was directed by A Boogie wit da Hoodie and Elf Rivera. It begins with A Boogie relaxing and walking through a thunderstorm in the night. He shows his eyes under his hooded raincoat to be lit neon blue. Boogie enters a place where he is joined by several people wearing hoodies obscuring their faces. He then recreates the cover of his mixtape Artist, where he is playing piano with a woman controlling his movements using strings, which are then cut by his camouflage-dressed alter ego. He later deals with paparazzi and goes to a strip club, before the video ends with him rapping and dancing while surrounded by female friends on quads.

Charts

Certifications

References

2019 singles
2019 songs
A Boogie wit da Hoodie songs
Songs written by A Boogie wit da Hoodie
Songs written by Wheezy (record producer)
Song recordings produced by Wheezy (record producer)
Atlantic Records singles